A.S.D. Arenzano F.C. is an Italian association football club, based in Arenzano, Liguria. Currently it plays in Promozione Liguria/A.

History

From Borgorosso Arenzano P.D. to A.S.D. Arenzano F.C.

In the 2010–11 season, Borgorosso Arenzano P.D. was relegated to Eccellenza from Serie D group A.

In the summer 2011, the club changed its name to the current one before playing in 2011–12 Eccellenza Liguria.

In the 2011–12 season, Arenzano was relegated to Promozione Liguria from Eccellenza Liguria.

Color and badge
The team's colors are white, red and black.

Honours
 Eccellenza Liguria: 2008–09

References

External links
Official site

Football clubs in Liguria